Bimodality is the simultaneous use of two distinct pitch collections.  It is more general than bitonality since the "scales" involved need not be traditional scales; if diatonic collections are involved, their pitch centers need not be the familiar major and minor-scale tonics.  One example is the opening (mm. 1–14) of Béla Bartók's "Boating" from Mikrokosmos (no. 125, vol. 5). Here, the right hand uses pitches of the pentatonic scale on E and the left hand uses those of the diatonic hexachord on C, perhaps suggesting G dorian or G mixolydian.

Bartók also uses the white-key and black-key collections (diatonic scale and its pentatonic complement) in no.6 of the Eight Improvisations, with the pentatonic as foreground, and in mm. 50–51 of the third movement of his Fourth Quartet, with the diatonic as foreground . 

Paul Wilson argues against analyzing Bartók's "Diminished Fifth" (Mikrokosmos vol. 4, no. 101) and "Harvest Song" (no. 33 of the Forty-Four Duos for two violins) as bitonal since in both "the larger octatonic collection embraces and supports both supposed tonalities" .  Here, the octatonic collection is partitioned into two four-note segments (4-10 or 0235) of the natural minor scales a tritone apart.

Sources

Musical techniques